Baily Farm is a historic home and barn located in West Bradford Township, Chester County, Pennsylvania. The house was built about 1795, and is a two-story, five bay, stuccoed stone dwelling in a vernacular Federal style.  It has a gable roof with gable end chimneys.  Also on the property is a frame bank barn on a stone foundation.  It is believed to date to the 18th century.

It was added to the National Register of Historic Places in 1985.

References

Houses on the National Register of Historic Places in Pennsylvania
Barns on the National Register of Historic Places in Pennsylvania
Federal architecture in Pennsylvania
Houses completed in 1795
Houses in Chester County, Pennsylvania
Barns in Pennsylvania
National Register of Historic Places in Chester County, Pennsylvania